José Manuel Aguirre Miramón (1813–1887) was a Spanish jurist, politician and writer.

Works
He published numerous papers and articles, especially related to the legal aspects of colonization. Among his works are:
Application of the new mortgage law to the overseas provinces. (1861)
Application of the Criminal Code to the overseas provinces. (1861)
Directorships of overseas. (1861)
From overseas legislation in relation to the different races of the population of the Philippines. (1861)
Proprietorship of artists in their art works. (1862)
Judicial power in the Spanish-American republics. (1862)
Mortgage law reform Overseas (1862)
Influence of wine desestanco coconut and nipa in crime in the Philippines. (1863)
Of special overseas laws and reform. (1863)
Causes of certiorari by the Indian Chamber of the Supreme Court of Justice. (1863)
Foreign law: administrative and civil institutions of China. (1864)
Legal and administrative reforms on the island of Santo Domingo. (1864)
Legislation overseas. Philippines: usurious contracts. (1864)
Executive action: award of costs to the judges. (1864)
Overseas Legislation: Implementation of the Code of Civil Procedure to the islands of Cuba and Puerto Rico (1866)
Penal Code Enforcement overseas. (1871)

19th-century Spanish writers
19th-century male writers
Spanish male poets
People from San Sebastián
History of the Philippines (1565–1898)
1813 births
1887 deaths